Mirza Ibrahim Beg, later known as Ibrahim Khan Fath-i-Jang (d. 1624) was the Subahdar of Bengal during the reign of emperor Jahangir. He was the brother to Empress Nur Jahan.

Biography
Born to a Shi'ite family, Khan was the son of Mirza Ghiyas Beg. His uncle, Muhammad-Tahir, was a learned man who composed poetry under the pen name of Wasli. Ibrahim Khan's father was a native of Tehran, and was the youngest son of Khvajeh Mohammad-Sharif. His father Ghiyas Beg migrated to the Mughal Empire after Sharif's death.

Ibrahim Khan served as a veteran in Akbar's reign. Qasim Khan Chishti's failure in military expeditions resulted in Ibrahim being appointed the next governor of Mughal Bengal in 1617, during the reign of Jahangir. In 1620, the Maghs of Arakan attacked the Bengali capital of Jahangirnagar (Dhaka). In response, Khan defeated them and captured 400 Magh war boats. This part of Dhaka continues to be known as Maghbazar. During his term, he also freed the Baro-Bhuiyan chief Musa Khan and his allies. It is said that Ibrahim Khan appointed Dilal Khan as Dhaka's naval commander.

He died on 20 April 1624 in an attack by the rebellious prince Shah Jahan.  He was buried in a tomb in Bhagalpur.

See also
List of rulers of Bengal
History of Bengal
History of Bangladesh
History of India

References

1624 deaths
Subahdars of Bengal
Indian Shia Muslims
Year of birth unknown